Siah Siah (also Romanized as Sīāh Sīāh; also known as Sīāh Sīāh-e Sanjābī) is a village in Zalu Ab Rural District, in the Central District of Ravansar County, Kermanshah Province, Iran. At the 2006 census, its population was 58, in 11 families.

References 

Populated places in Ravansar County